Batman Returns is the Super Nintendo version of Batman Returns, a 1993 beat 'em up video game for the Super Nintendo Entertainment System based on the film of the same name. It was developed and published by Konami.

Gameplay

The game is a left-to-right scrolling fighter beat 'em up, a genre that was featured heavily on the console at the time. The gameplay and graphics are very similar to the Final Fight games. The game takes the player through seven scenes featured in the film. Each scene has a boss fight that Batman must win in order to proceed to the next scene. Scene 1 takes place in Gotham's Plaza, where Batman fights numerous Red Triangle Circus gangsters and saves Selina Kyle from the Stungun Clown who took her hostage. In Scene 2, Batman fights the Circus gang throughout Gotham City's Streets, facing the Tattooed Strongman as the boss. Climbing on the rooftops of Scene 3, Batman encounters Catwoman, who escapes to an abandoned building where Penguin's setting a trap for Batman, but he manages to take on Catwoman and Penguin on Scene 4. In Scene 5, Batman drives the Batmobile and uses a machine gun to destroy Penguin's Campaign Van. Moving to Scene 6, Batman goes to the Circus Train and defeats Penguin's right-hand man, the Organ Grinder. Penguin escapes to the abandoned Arctic World on Scene 7, where Batman destroys his Duck Vehicle and ultimately gains the upper hand on Penguin once and for all. Meanwhile, Catwoman escapes and watches as Batman gets called for another adventure. Various members of the Red Triangle Circus Gang attack Batman throughout the game. Batman has a number of weapons and moves at his disposal, including the batarang.

Reception

Scary Larry of GamePro gave the game a perfect score, singling out praise for the visuals, animations, score and adjustable difficulty level.

Super Gamer gave an overall score of 90%, writing "The soundtrack is awesome, the graphics brilliant and playability excellent. This is undoubtedly one of the finest scrolling beat ‘em ups."

Accolades
In 2018, Complex placed the game 97th on their "The Best Super Nintendo Games of All Time".  They also praised the game being a good translation from the movie and described the game as a "beat-em-up gem". Nintendo Power ranked Batman Returns the eighth best SNES game of 1993. In 2023, Time Extension included the game on their top 25 "Best Beat 'Em Ups of All Time" list.

References

External links

1993 video games
Video games based on Batman films
Batman (1989 film series)
Konami beat 'em ups
Super Nintendo Entertainment System games
Super Nintendo Entertainment System-only games
Video games developed in Japan
Superhero video games
Video games based on works by Tim Burton
Video games set in the United States